The Melbourne Symphony Orchestra (MSO) is an Australian orchestra based in Melbourne. The MSO is resident at Hamer Hall. The MSO has its own choir, the MSO Chorus, following integration with the Melbourne Chorale in 2008.

The MSO relies on funding by the Victorian State Government and the Federal government and support from private corporations and donors. It is supported by Symphony Services International. Sophie Galaise joined the MSO as its first female managing director in 2016. Its current chairman is David Li.

History
The founder of the Albert Street Conservatorium Orchestra was Alberto Zelman. This orchestra gave its first concert on 11 December 1906. In 1923, Bertha Jorgensen became the first female leader of a professional orchestra in Australia, and she went on to play with the orchestra for 50 years and became the longest-serving female leader of an orchestra on an international scale.  In 1927, the Albert Street Conservatorium Orchestra combined with the Melbourne University Symphony Orchestra to form the Melbourne Symphony Orchestra.

In 1934, the MSO became one of the Australian Broadcasting Commission's radio orchestras. In 1949, the orchestra took on the new name of the Victorian Symphony Orchestra, reverting to the Melbourne Symphony Orchestra in 1965. Following the re-structure of the Australian Broadcasting Commission into a corporation, in 1997 the Melbourne Symphony Orchestra became a wholly-owned subsidiary of the ABC. It became an independent company when the six Australia state orchestras were divested from the corporation in 2007.

The MSO's longest-serving chief conductor was Hiroyuki Iwaki (1974–1997), who was named Conductor Laureate of the orchestra in 1989 and held the title until his death in 2006. The orchestra's most recent chief conductor, Sir Andrew Davis, was appointed in June 2012. Davis gave his inaugural concerts as the MSO's chief conductor in 2013, having made his debut with the orchestra in 2009. The MSO also works with principal conductor-in-residence Benjamin Northey, principal guest conductor Xian Zhang and guest conductors like Thomas Adès, John Adams, Tan Dun, Markus Stenz and Simone Young.

The MSO was the first Australian orchestra to perform overseas (New Zealand, 1965), and the first to play in Carnegie Hall, New York, in 1970. Its overseas tours – the US, Canada, Japan, Korea, Europe (2000, 2007, 2014), China (2002), St Petersburg, Russia (2003) and Japan (2005) – have gained it widespread international recognition. In January 2000, under the baton of the then chief conductor and artistic director Markus Stenz, the MSO represented Australasia at the Festival of the Five Continents in the Canary Islands alongside other orchestras such as the Berlin Philharmonic and New York Philharmonic. In January 2007 the Orchestra embarked on its second European tour, visiting five cities in Spain (Castellon, Barcelona, Zaragoza, Pamplona, Madrid), Paris, Berlin and Milan.

Sir Andrew Davis took up his duties as chief conductor in 2013. During his tenure, the MSO made its debut at five of the classical music festivals, including The Proms and the Edinburgh International Festival. In July 2015, the MSO extended Davis' contract through 2019. In April 2018, the MSO announced that Davis is to conclude his MSO chief conductorship at the end of December 2019.

In April 2020, in the wake of the COVID-19 pandemic and the cancellation of live performances, the MSO management stood down the MSO musicians and selected administrative staff into 'hibernation' status. In December 2020, the MSO launched its on-demand digital streaming platform, MSO.LIVE, which broadcasts performances to audiences at home.

Jaime Martín first guest-conducted the MSO in June 2019, and returned for an additional guest-conducting appearance in February 2021. In June 2021, the MSO announced the appointment of Martín as its next chief conductor, and Martín gave his first performance in the role at Hamer Hall in February 2022.

The MSO's recent discs include Strauss' Four Last Songs, Don Juan and Also sprach Zarathustra on ABC Classics. On the Chandos label the MSO has recently released Berlioz' Harold en Italie with James Ehnes and Ives' Symphonies No. 1 and No. 2, both led by Sir Andrew Davis.

Chief conductors

 Alberto Zelman (1906–1927 at Albert Street Conservatorium Orchestra)
 Fritz Hart (1927–1932)
 Fritz Hart, Bernard Heinze (1932–1937, joint chief conductors)
 Bernard Heinze (1937–1950; Sir Bernard from 1949)
 Alceo Galliera (1950–1951)
 Juan José Castro (1952–1953)
 Walter Susskind (1953–1955)
 Kurt Wöss (1956–1959)
 Georges Tzipine (1960–1965)
 Willem van Otterloo (1967–1970)
 Fritz Rieger (1971–1972)
 Hiroyuki Iwaki (1974–1997)
 Markus Stenz (1998–2004)
 Oleg Caetani (2005–2009)
 Sir Andrew Davis (2013–2019)
 Jaime Martín (2022–present)

Discography

Charting albums

Awards and nominations

APRA Awards 

Since 2003 APRA AMCOS (Australasian Performing Right Association and Australasian Mechanical Copyright Owners Society) have combined with AMC (Australian Music Centre) to present the Classical Music Awards at an annual ceremony as part of the APRA Music Awards. In 2011 the Classical Music Awards were re-branded as the Art Music Awards.

!
|-
| 2003
| "End of All Journeys" (Andrew Batterham) – MSO
| Orchestral Work of the Year
| 
|
|-
| 2005
| Moments of Bliss (Brett Dean) – MSO
| Best Performance of an Australian Composition
| 
|
|-
| rowspan="2"| 2006
| Oboe Concerto (Ross Edwards – MSO, Diana Doherty
| Orchestral Work of the Year
| 
| rowspan="2"| 
|-
| Community Outreach 2005 Program – MSO
| Outstanding Contribution to Australian Music in Education
| 
|-
| 2007
| Welcome to the MCG (Christopher Gordon) – MSO, Lyn Williams
| Orchestral Work of the Year
| 
| 
|-
| rowspan="5"| 2008
| 90 Minutes Circling the Earth (Stuart Greenbaum) – MSO, Brett Kelly
| rowspan="4"| Orchestral Work of the Year
| 
| rowspan="5"| 
|-
| Glass Soldier Suite (Nigel Westlake) – MSO, Geoffrey Payne, Jean-Louis Forestier
| 
|-
| Musaic (Anne Cawrse) – MSO, Kevin Field
| 
|-
| Oboe Concertante (Margaret Sutherland) – MSO, Jiří Tancibudek, Patrick Thomas
| 
|-
| Hunger – MSO's ArtPlay ensemble
| Outstanding Contribution to Australian Music in Education
| 
|-
| 2009
| Noumen (Robert Dahm) – MSO, Reinbert de Leeuw
| Orchestral Work of the Year
| 
| 
|-
| 2012
| Gardener of Time (Barry Conyngham) – MSO
| Work of the Year – Orchestral
| 
|
|-
|rowspan="2"| 2014
|rowspan="2"| The Last Days of Socrates (Brett Dean, Graeme Ellis) – MSO and Chorus, Peter Coleman-Wright, Simone Young
| Work of the Year – Orchestral
| 
|rowspan="2"| 
|-
| Performance of the Year
| 
|-
|rowspan="3"| 2022
| The Rest Is Silence (Anne Cawrse) – MSO, Michael Pisani, Nicholas Carter
| Work of the Year: Large Ensemble
| 
|rowspan="3"| 
|-
| Love Is a Temporary Madness, The Symphonic Suite (Vanessa Perica) – MSO, Vanessa Perica Orchestra, Benjamin Northey
| Performance of the Year: Jazz / Improvised Music
| 
|-
| WATA (Paul Grabowsky, Daniel Wilfred, David Wilfred) – MSO, Australian Art Orchestra, Paul Grabowsky, Daniel Wilfred, David Wilfred, Benjamin Northey
| Performance of the Year: Notated Composition
| 
|-
|}

ARIA Music Awards
The ARIA Music Awards is an annual awards ceremony that recognises excellence, innovation, and achievement across all genres of Australian music. They commenced in 1987. 

! 
|-
| 1991
| Percy Grainger: Orchestral Works (with Geoffrey Simon)
|rowspan="4" | Best Classical Album
| 
|rowspan="4" | 
|-
| 1994
| Violin Concertos (with Dene Olding & Hiroyuki Iwaki)
| 
|-
| 1995
| Simple Gifts (with Yvonne Kenny & Vladimir Kamirski)
| 
|-
| 1999
| The Eternal Rhythm (with Vernon Handley)
| 
|-
| 2001
| Music from the Motion Picture – The Dish
| Best Original Soundtrack
| 
| 
|-
|rowspan="2" | 2013
| Catch Me If You Can (with Amy Dickson)
|rowspan="3" | Best Classical Album
| 
|rowspan="2" | 
|-
| Missa Solis: Requiem for Eli (with Nigel Westlake)
| 
|-
| 2014
| Ades Polaris / Stanhope Piccolo Concerto (with Andrew Macleod, Benjamin Northey & Markus Stenz)
| 
| 
|-
| 2015
| Paper Planes – Original Motion Picture Soundtrack (with Nigel Westlake)
| Best Original Soundtrack, Cast or Show Album
| 
| 
|-
| 2017
| Medtner: Piano Concerto No. 1 / Rachmaninoff: Piano Concerto No. 2 (with Jayson Gillham & Benjamin Northey)
|rowspan="3" | Best Classical Album
| 
| 
|-
|rowspan="2" | 2022
| Ross Edwards: Frog and Star Cycle / Symphonies 2 & 3 (with Amy Dickson, Colin Currie, Lothar Koenigs, Yvonne Kenny, David Zinman, Sydney Symphony Orchestra, & Markus Stenz)
| 
|rowspan="2" | 
|-
| The Enchanted Loom: Orchestral Works by Carl Vine (with Sir Andrew Davis)
|

Helpmann Awards 
 2003 Nominated twice for Best Classical Concert Presentation
 2004 Nominated for Best Performance in a Classical Concert – MSO Chief Conductor Marcus Stenz
 2007 Winner of Best Performance in a Classical Concert Presentation
 2008 Winner of Best Performances in a Classical Concert
 2011 Nominated twice for Best Symphony Orchestra Concert
 2015 Nominated twice for Best Symphony Orchestra Concert

References

External links

 
 eMelbourne:the city past and present
 Melbourne Stage Archive, "A Century of Symphony"
 Katherine Gilmour, "Melba Conservatorium of Music". eMelbourne website

1906 establishments in Australia
APRA Award winners
ARIA Award winners
Australian orchestras
Performing arts in Melbourne
Musical groups established in 1906
Symphony orchestras